Tan Lun (courtesy name Zili 子理, 以詔; Art name Erhua 二華, (1519 –1577) was an eminent Han Chinese official, military general, of the Jiajing Emperor of mid-Ming Dynasty in China.

Tan Lun raised and organized Qi Jiguang and several other generals to fight effectively against the Jiajing wokou pirates and along with other prominent figures restored the stability of the Ming Dynasty. He was known for his strategic perception, administrative skill, and for consolidating military strength during the middle Ming Dynasty. He was also known for his ruthlessness in the execution of his policies. Tan also exemplified loyalty in an era of chaos. He died in 1577, where he was bestowed the posthumous honour of Grand Guardian of the Heir Apparent.

Popular culture
The 1975 King Hu film The Valiant Ones features Tan Lun.

References
History of Ming
Huang, Ray. 1587, a Year of No Significance: The Ming Dynasty in Decline. New Haven: Yale University Press, 1981.

1519 births
1577 deaths
Ming dynasty generals
People from Fuzhou, Jiangxi
Generals from Jiangxi
Viceroys of Liangguang